Asay may refer to:

People
 Alma Asay, American co-founder of a legal technology company
 Amanda Asay (1988–2022), Canadian baseball and ice hockey player
 Carlos E. Asay (1926–1999), American general authority
 Chuck Asay (born 1942), American cartoonist
 Daniel V. Asay (1847–1930), American iceboat racer
 David Asay (born 1925), American politician
 Katrina Asay (born 1957), American politician
 Mark Asay (1964–2017), American spree killer

Places
 Asay, Utah, an abandoned town located in Garfield County, Utah